Goldfield's bullfrog (Neobatrachus wilsmorei), or Wilsmore's frog, is a species of frog in the family Limnodynastidae.
It is endemic to Australia.
Its natural habitats are temperate shrubland, subtropical or tropical dry shrubland, Mediterranean-type shrubby vegetation, subtropical or tropical dry lowland grassland, intermittent freshwater marshes, hot deserts, and temperate desert.

References

Neobatrachus
Amphibians of Western Australia
Taxonomy articles created by Polbot
Amphibians described in 1940
Frogs of Australia